The following article gives a list of association football confederations, sub-confederations and associations around the world. The sport's international governing body is FIFA, but those associations not affiliated with FIFA are also included in this article.

Most European, African, and Asian countries have two principal competitions: a more prestigious league which is typically a double round-robin tournament restricted to the elite clubs, and a cup which is a single-elimination tournament open to both the elite and lesser clubs.

In the Americas, leagues are often organised as either multi-stage tournaments or separate Apertura and Clausura stages.

By continent

Affiliated with FIFA
There are currently 211 national associations which are members of FIFA. An additional 11 associations are full or associate members of a FIFA continental confederation, but not members of FIFA.

Other governing bodies

By subregion

Africa

Asia

¹ It may be revived in 2022 – see 2022 ASEAN Club Championship.

North, Central America and the Caribbean

By country
The football associations listed in this section are members of FIFA-affiliated confederations. They are listed by their official names registered with FIFA.

Africa

Asia

Europe

All UEFA associations are affiliated with FIFA.

North, Central America and the Caribbean

Oceania

South America

All CONMEBOL associations are affiliated with FIFA.

Non-FIFA associations

The football associations in this section represent fully and partially recognized sovereign states, dependent territories, and stateless nations that are not members of FIFA or a FIFA confederation.

Several of these non-FIFA associations are included in the World Football Elo Ratings, which ranks all national association football teams from FIFA-affiliated confederations, in addition to some unaffiliated teams. Several of these associations are also members of the Confederation of Independent Football Associations and/or the International Island Games Association.

Africa

Asia

Europe

  Akrotiri and Dhekelia and  Svalbard do not have a Football Association.

North, Central America and the Caribbean

Oceania

  Pitcairn Islands does not have a Football Association.

South America

Regional
Beneath the national level, governance of football may be divided up into regional or territorial associations. Other non-national associations represent stateless populations, diasporas or micronations. Details of these are listed at non-FIFA international football.

See also
 Domestic association football season
 List of association football competitions
 List of FIFA country codes
 List of national football teams
 List of sports attendance figures — Attendances of many domestic and international competitions, compared with those of other sports around the world
 Lists of association football clubs
 Association football by country subdivision

References

References

Association football-related lists
Association football
Association football